Jonas Björkman and Patrick Rafter were the defending champions, but lost in the second round this year.

Wayne Black and Sandon Stolle won the title, defeating Ellis Ferreira and Rick Leach 7–6(7–4), 6–3 in the final.

Seeds

Draw

Finals

Top half

Bottom half

References
Draw

1999 ATP Tour
1999 Newsweek Champions Cup and the Evert Cup